Neil Smallwood (born 3 December 1966) is an English former professional footballer who played as a goalkeeper in the Football League for York City and Darlington, and in non-League football for Goole Town, Nestlé Rowntree, Pickering Town and York Railway Institute.

References

1966 births
Living people
Footballers from York
English footballers
Association football goalkeepers
York City F.C. players
Darlington F.C. players
Goole Town F.C. players
Nestlé Rowntree F.C. players
Pickering Town F.C. players
York Railway Institute A.F.C. players
English Football League players